Albany County is a county in the U.S. state of Wyoming. As of the 2020 United States Census, the population was 37,066. Its county seat is Laramie, the site of the University of Wyoming. Its south border lies on the northern Colorado state line.

Albany County comprises the Laramie, WY Micropolitan Statistical Area. It is the fifth-most populous county in Wyoming.

History
Albany County was organized in 1868 of territory annexed from Laramie County in Dakota Territory, which at the time had jurisdiction over part of modern-day Wyoming. It became a county in Wyoming Territory when its government was formally organized on May 19, 1869.

Charles D. Bradley, a member of the legislature of the Dakota Territory named the county for Albany, New York, the capital of his native state. In 1875, the Wyoming Territorial legislature authorized portions of Albany County to be annexed to create Crook and Johnson counties, and in 1888 land was taken from Albany County for the creation of Converse County. Further adjustments were made to the county's boundary in 1911 and 1955.

Geography

Adjacent counties

 Converse County – north
 Platte County – northeast
 Laramie County – east
 Larimer County, Colorado – south
 Jackson County, Colorado – southwest
 Carbon County – west
 Natrona County – northwest

Major highways
   Interstate 80

  U.S. Highway 30
  U.S. Highway 287
  Wyoming Highway 10
  Wyoming Highway 11
  Wyoming Highway 12
  Wyoming Highway 13
  Wyoming Highway 34
  Wyoming Highway 130
  Wyoming Highway 210
  Wyoming Highway 230

National protected areas

 Bamforth National Wildlife Refuge
 Hutton Lake National Wildlife Refuge
 Medicine Bow National Forest (part)
 Mortenson Lake National Wildlife Refuge

Demographics

2000 census
At the 2000 United States Census, there were 32,014 people, 13,269 households and 7,006 families in the county. The population density was 8 per square mile (3/km2). There were 15,215 housing units at an average density of 4 per square mile (1/km2). The racial makeup of the county was 91.32% White, 1.11% Black or African American, 0.95% Native American, 1.7% Asian, 0.06% Pacific Islander, 2.65% from other races, and 2.22% from two or more races. 7.49% of the population were Hispanic or Latino of any race. 24.4% were of German, 11.1% English, 10.2% Irish and 6.1% American ancestry.

There were 13,269 households, of which 23.9% had children under the age of 18 living with them, 42.0% were married couples living together, 7.5% had a female householder with no husband present, and 47.2% were non-families. 31.4% of all households were made up of individuals, and 6.2% had someone living alone who was 65 years of age or older. The average household size was 2.23 and the average family size was 2.84.

The county population contained 18.4% of the population under the age of 18, 28.2% from 18 to 24, 26.1% from 25 to 44, 19.1% from 45 to 64, and 8.3% who were 65 years of age or older. The median age was 27 years. For every 100 females there were 106.7 males. For every 100 females age 18 and over, there were 106.4 males.

The median household income was $28,790 and the median family income was $44,334. Males had a median income of $31,087 compared with $22,061 for females. The per capita income for the county was $16,706. About 10.8% of families and 21.0% of the population were below the poverty line, including 15.7% of those under the age of 18 and 8.8% of those 65 and older were living below the poverty line.

2010 census
As of the 2010 United States Census, there were 36,299 people, 15,691 households, and 7,430 families in the county. The racial makeup of the county was 90.1% white, 2.8% Asian, 1.2% black or African American, 0.7% American Indian, 0.1% Pacific islander, 2.4% from other races, and 2.7% from two or more races. Those of Hispanic or Latino origin made up 8.8% of the population. In terms of ancestry, 31.2% were German, 15.3% were Irish, 12.5% were English, and 4.4% were American.

Of the 15,691 households, 21.0% had children under the age of 18 living with them, 36.9% were married couples living together, 6.7% had a female householder with no husband present, 52.6% were non-families, and 34.9% of all households were made up of individuals. The average household size was 2.17 and the average family size was 2.84. The median age was 26.8 years.

The median income for a household in the county was $42,890 and the median income for a family was $70,054. Males had a median income of $43,484 versus $33,512 for females. The per capita income for the county was $25,622. About 7.2% of families and 21.5% of the population were below the poverty line, including 10.7% of those under age 18 and 6.6% of those age 65 or over.

Communities

City
 Laramie (county seat)

Town
 Rock River

Unincorporated communities

 Barrett
 Binford
 Bosler
 Bosler Junction
 Buford
 Cooper Lake
 Dale Creek
 Deerwood
 Garrett
 Gramm
 Harmony
 Harper
 Hatton
 Hermosa
 Keystone
 Little Medicine
 Lookout
 Millbrook
 Mountain Home
 New Jelm
 PhinDeli
 Red Buttes
 Sherman
 The Buttes
 Tie Siding
 Toltec
 Wilcox
 Wyocolo

Census-designated places

 Albany
 Centennial
 Fox Park
 Woods Landing-Jelm

Politics
While Wyoming as a whole tends to be solidly Republican, Albany County is a swing county. It is one of only thirteen counties to have voted for Obama in 2008, Romney in 2012, Trump in 2016, and Biden in 2020.

See also
 Albany County Sheriff's Office (Wyoming)
 National Register of Historic Places listings in Albany County, Wyoming
 Mortenson Lake National Wildlife Refuge, the last home of the Wyoming toad, located in southern Albany County
Wyoming
List of cities and towns in Wyoming
List of counties in Wyoming
Wyoming statistical areas

Notes

References

 
1868 establishments in Wyoming Territory
Populated places established in 1868